
Lumbfoot or Lumb Foot is a hamlet in the Haworth, Cross Roads and Stanbury civil parish, and the City of Bradford metropolitan district, England. The hamlet is historically part of the West Riding of Yorkshire. Lumbfoot overlooks a number of fields and a small brook, and contains 15 households and a farm. There is no public road; access is by a private road for vehicles, and a public footpath.

History 

The mill has since been largely demolished but a 15-foot stump of the chimney and the engine house still remain, and there is evidence of the pit that housed the original waterwheel among the ruins. A row of cottages at Lumbfoot, which today are modernised, were constructed between 1840 and 1852 to house mill workers.

Gallery

References

External links
Haworth, Cross Roads and Stanbury Parish Council

Geography of the City of Bradford
Villages in West Yorkshire